Jerry Behn (born January 31, 1954) is an American politician who served as a member of the Iowa Senate for the 24th district from 1997 to 2021.

Career 
Behn served as a Boone County supervisor from 1995 to 1996.

Behn served on the Senate Appropriations committee; the Senate Commerce committee; the Senate State Government committee; the Senate Environment & Energy Independence committee, and the Senate Ethics committee. He also served on the Senate Administration and Regulation Appropriations Subcommittee.

Behn was last re-elected in 2008 with 22,970 votes (57%), defeating Democratic opponent, former Iowa Senator Albert Sorensen.

Behn was a candidate for the 2010 Iowa gubernatorial election but withdrew, endorsing Terry Branstad.

Behn is a supporter of capital punishment, he has introduced a limited death penalty bill in each General Assembly since 1997. his latest attempt was in 2019.

References

External links
Senator Jerry Behn official Iowa Legislature site
Senator Jerry Behn official Iowa General Assembly site
Senator Jerry Behn at Iowa Senate Republican Caucus
 

|-

|-

1954 births
21st-century American politicians
County supervisors in Iowa
Republican Party Iowa state senators
Living people
People from Boone, Iowa